Begoña Victoria (Vicky) García Varas is a pageant titleholder, was born in Caracas, Venezuela in 1966. She is the Miss Venezuela International titleholder for 1987, and was the official representative of Venezuela to the Miss International 1987 pageant held in Tokyo, Japan, on September 13, 1987, when she classified in the Top 15 semifinalists.

García competed in the national beauty pageant Miss Venezuela 1987 and obtained the title of Miss Venezuela International. She represented the Municipio Libertador.

References

External links
Miss Venezuela Official Website
Miss International Official Website

1966 births
Living people
People from Caracas
Miss Venezuela International winners
Miss International 1987 delegates